Kulusunnakh (Kuluhunnaax) is a rural locality (a selo) in Dalyrsky Rural Okrug of Verkhnevilyuysky District in the Sakha Republic, Russia, located  from Verkhnevilyuysk, the administrative center of the district and  from Dalyr, the administrative center of the rural okrug. Its population as of the 2010 Census was 19, of whom 12 were male and 7 female, up from 13 as recorded during the 2002 Census.

References

Notes

Sources
Official website of the Sakha Republic. Registry of the Administrative-Territorial Divisions of the Sakha Republic. Verkhnevilyuysky District. 

Rural localities in Verkhnevilyuysky District